N-formylmethionyl-peptidase ((fMet)-releasing enzyme, formylmethionine aminopeptidase) is an enzyme. This enzyme catalyses the following chemical reaction

 Release of an N-terminal, formyl-methionyl residue from a polypeptide

This enzyme is highly specific for N-formylmethionyl peptides.

References

External links 
 

EC 3.4.19